Jeena Teri Gali Mein  is an Indian musical romantic film directed by Tinnu Anand and produced by Gulshan Kumar. It stars Suraj, Kavita Kapoor, Amita Nangia, Archana Puran Singh and Kunika. The movie was initially planned for Home Video viewing. However, after the tremendous response received for the music, it was released in theaters.

Soundtrack
The music of the album was composed by Babul Bose and the lyrics were written by Ravinder Rawal and Naqsh Lyallpuri (one song, "Mildi Naseeban Naal"). All the songs were sung by Anuradha Paudwal along with S. P. Balasubrahmanyam, Mohammed Aziz, Udit Narayan, Kumar Sanu, Nitin Mukesh and Debashish Dasgupta.

External links
 

1990s Hindi-language films
Films scored by Babul Bose
1980s Hindi-language films
T-Series (company) films